Jules Henri Ghislain Marie, Baron de Trooz (21 February 1857 – 31 December 1907) was a Belgian Catholic Party politician.

De Trooz was born in Leuven, and had studied philosophy before entering politics. He represented Leuven in the Belgian Chamber of People's Representatives from 1899 onwards, serving as Education and Interior minister. In 1907 he became the prime minister of Belgium, retaining the Interior portfolio.

He was the second Belgian prime minister to die in office, after Barthélémy de Theux de Meylandt.

Honours 
 : Minister of State by Royal Decree.
 : knight Order of Leopold
 : Knight grand Cross in the Order of the Redeemer
 :knight Commander in the Order of Saint Sylvester Pope
 :knight in the Order of Pope Pius IX
 : Pro Ecclesia et Pontifice
 Knight grand Cross in the Order of the Red Eagle
 Knight grand Cross in the Order of the Double Dragon
 Knight grand Cross in the  Order of the Lion and the Sun

References

External links
 Jules de Trooz in ODIS - Online Database for Intermediary Structures

1857 births
1907 deaths
Barons of Belgium
Catholic Party (Belgium) politicians
Politicians from Leuven
Prime Ministers of Belgium
Grand Officiers of the Légion d'honneur